Legionella gormanii is a Gram-negative bacterium from the genus Legionella which was isolated from soil samples from a creek bank in Atlanta and from the bronchial brush specimen of a patient who suffered from pneumonia. L. gormanii can cause atypical pneumonia together with L. pneumophila.

References

Legionellales
Bacteria described in 1980